Sodalitas Litterarum Vistulana ("Literary Sodality of the Vistula") was an international academic society modelled after the Roman Academy, founded around 1488 in Cracow by Conrad Celtes, a German humanist scholar who in other areas founded several similar societies.

The society was active in the fields of mathematics, astronomy and the natural sciences. Notable members, besides Conrad Celtes, were Albert Brudzewski, Filip Callimachus, Laurentius Corvinus.

1480s establishments in Europe
History of Kraków
Science and technology in Poland
15th-century establishments in Poland